Overda is an unincorporated community located in Lawrence County, Kentucky, United States. Its post office  is closed.

References

Unincorporated communities in Lawrence County, Kentucky
Unincorporated communities in Kentucky